Kaddish is a 1994 album by Salem. The album was one of the first Israeli extreme metal albums to engage with recent Jewish history and the Holocaust.

References

1994 albums
Salem (Israeli band) albums
Songs about the Holocaust